Nadjem Lens Annab (born 20 July 1988) is a Belgian-Algerian professional football player who plays as a midfielder.

Personal
Born in Belgium, Annab's family is originally from Algeria. His father is an ethnic Chaoui from Merouana, while his mother is also from the Batna province. He has two brothers and a younger sister.

Club career
Annab signed a contract with Westerlo in April 2008, while he was playing for Eisden Sport in Limburg Third Division, the 7th of 8 levels in the Belgian football league system. Annab also played futsal for ZVK Eisden Dorp at that moment, but quit after his surprise transfer. Lens Annab made his debut at the highest level in a 0–1 victory against Mouscron on 12 September 2009 and from then on featured regularly in the team. Following the relegation of Westerlo in 2012, Annab chose to accept an offer from ES Sétif, allowing him to move to his second home country, Algeria.
On 5 August 2014 Lens Annab signs a contract with second division team ASV Geel.

References

External links
 Player profile at sporza.be 
 

1988 births
Living people
People from Maaseik
Chaoui people
Belgian people of Algerian-Berber descent
Belgian footballers
Association football midfielders
K.V.C. Westerlo players
ES Sétif players
Lierse S.K. players
AS Verbroedering Geel players
K.V.V. Thes Sport Tessenderlo players
K. Patro Eisden Maasmechelen players
Belgian Pro League players
Footballers from Limburg (Belgium)